David Philippaerts (born 7 December 1983 in Pietrasanta) is an Italian former professional motocross racer of Italian and Belgian descent. He competed in the Motocross World Championships from 2000 to 2014 before returning as a wild card in 2022.

Philippaerts was the 2008 F.I.M. world champion in the MX-1GP class riding for a Yamaha team run by former motocross world champion Michele Rinaldi.

References 

1983 births
Living people
People from Pietrasanta
Italian motocross riders
Italian people of Belgian descent
Sportspeople from the Province of Lucca